Maung may be,

Maung people of Australia
Maung language

Places
Batu Maung

Vehicle
Pindad Maung

People
Maung, an honorific in Burmese names
Maung Maung (disambiguation)
Cynthia Maung
Maung Khin
Kin Maung
Win Maung
Tin Maung
Nay Win Maung
Chit Maung
Kyi Maung
Bawa Maung
Saw Maung (painter)
Saw Maung
Maung Wunna
Shwe Maung
Thakin Chit Maung
Thant Sin Maung
Maung Sein Pe

Burmese names
Burmese-language surnames
Surnames of Burmese origin